Kavacık is a village in the Yenipazar District, Bilecik Province, Turkey. Its population is 95 (2021).

References

Villages in Yenipazar District, Bilecik